Neyyattinkara taluk is part of Trivandrum (Lok Sabha constituency) except kattakada assembly constituency which is part of Attingal (Lok Sabha constituency).

Neyyattinkara taluk includes 4 assembly constituencies (Kattakada, Neyyattinkara, Parassala, Kovalam) in the Kerala Legislative Assembly.
In early 2012, Neyyattinkara constituency attracted statewide attention, as it witnessed a much fiercely contested by-elections that Kerala Politics have ever seen caused by the resignation of the MLA R. Selvaraj. The tri-cornered contest was between O. Rajagopal of BJP, F. Lawrence of CPI(M) and Selvaraj (Now, of INC), with Selvaraj emerging as the winner finally.

Current MP: Dr. Shashi Tharoor (Indian National Congress party, re-elected as MP on 20 April 2014)

Neyyattinkara MLA: K. A. Ansalan, (Communist Party of India (Marxist) party, elected as MLA on 2016). In 2016 Assembly Election, K. Ansalan, the Left Democratic Front (LDF) candidate, won a stunning victory by a margin of 9,543 votes against R. Selvaraj, who defected from the CPI (M) to the Congress in 2012 and romped home by a margin of 6,334 votes in the by-election.

Kattakada MLA: N. Sakthan, (Indian National Congress party, Deputy Speaker)

Neyyattinkara  Municipality led by LDF COM. WR Heeba CPI(M) district committee member elected as chairperson and Com. KK Shibu CPI(M) Vice chairman.

Parassala MLA: A.T. George, (Indian National Congress party)

Kovalam MLA: Jameela Prakasam, (Janata Dal (Secular))

2014 Elections
In the 2014 Parliament Election (held on 2014-04-20) Dr. Shashi Tharoor (UDF) got maximum number of votes from Neyyattinkara Constituency i.e., Neyyattinkara – UDF – 48,009, BJP – 28958, LDF – 39806; Dr. Tharoor got an additional 19,051 votes against BJP from Neyyattinkara Constituency alone that resulted in his ultimate success against BJP. Finally, he won the election with 14,501 votes. The election results of other constituencies in this regard are: Parassala – UDF – 50360, BJP – 39753, LDF – 47953; Kovalam – UDF – 51401, BJP – 36169, LDF – 42112; Nemom – UDF – 32639, BJP – 50685, LDF – 31643; Thiruvananthapuram – UDF – 39027, BJP 40835, LDF – 27385; Vattiyoorkavu – UDF – 40663, BJP – 43589 – LDF, 27504; Kazhakoottam – UDF 34220, BJP – 41,829, LDF - 31799

2015 Elections

References

Neyyattinkara